House Broken is the second live album by American progressive rock/AOR band Pavlov's Dog, released in 2016.

The album is an audio-visual recording of Pavlov's Dog live concert at the Der Hirsch music venue in Nuremberg, Germany, during their 2015 European Tour.

The band performed songs from their previously released albums, their then upcoming album Prodigal Dreamer, two songs from David Surkamp's solo work Dancing on the Edge of a Teacup, as well as one song from Hi-Fi's album Moods for Mallards. They also played the previously unreleased "Canadian Rain", with David Surkamp introducing the song as one of the last things he wrote with Douglas Rayburn before the latter died in 2012. "Crying Forever" was written by Surkamp for Savoy Brown, included in their 2007 studio album Steel. Pavlov's Dog later recorded their own studio version for their 2018 album Prodigal Dreamer.

As the band's only constant member and leader, David Surkamp thought the line-up Pavlov's Dog had during the time of the album's recording was the best ever. To support that, he said that when he wrote "Did You See Him Cry" for the At the Sound of the Bell album in 1976 the band couldn't play it live because it was too hard for them, while the 2015 members "tear it up".

Track listing
All tracks credited to David Surkamp, except where noted.

CD1

CD2

DVD
The DVD contains all songs from CD1 and CD2 in the same running order.

Personnel
All information according to the album's liner notes.

Pavlov's Dog
David Surkamp: vocals, guitar
Abbie Hainz-Steiling: violin, mandolin, vocals
Amanda McCoy: guitar, vocals
Manfred Ploetz: drums
Rick Steiling: bass guitar
Nathan Jatcko: keyboards
Sara Surkamp: vocals, acoustic gutar

Production
Manfred Ploetz: producer
Andreas Weimann : film director
Matthias Lingenfelder: audio engineer
Saylor Surkamp: introductory film sequence

Artwork
Sara Surkamp: art direction
Hanna Barton: cover photography
Philippe Maquet: band photography

References

2016 live albums
Pavlov's Dog (band) albums